Harthof is an U-Bahn station in Munich on the U2.

Munich U-Bahn stations
Railway stations in Germany opened in 1993
Infrastructure completed in 1993